Rensford is an unincorporated community in Kanawha County, West Virginia, United States. Its post office  is closed. It was also known as Point Lick.

The community most likely was named after the Rensord family.

References 

Unincorporated communities in West Virginia
Unincorporated communities in Kanawha County, West Virginia